This is a list of international trips made by Maithripala Sirisena as the 7th President of Sri Lanka from 2015 to 2019.

Summary of International Trips

During his term, Maithripala Sirisena made 47 foreign trips to 29 countries. Sirisena never visited South America.

2015
Maithripala Sirisena made 10 trips to 10 countries in the year 2015.

2016
Maithripala Sirisena made 12 trips to 9 countries during the year 2016.

2017
Maithripala Sirisena made 7 trips to 7 countries in the year 2017.

2018
Maithripala Sirisena made 10 trips to 10 countries in 2019.

2019
Maithripala Sirisena made 8 trips to 8 countries in the year 2019.

Cancelled visits

Multilateral meetings participated in by Sirisena

See also
 Foreign policy of Maithripala Sirisena
 Timeline of the presidency of Maithripala Sirisena
 List of international prime ministerial trips made by Ranil Wickremesinghe

References

External links

Official
 State Visits  – President's Media Division

Presidential Trips
2015 in international relations
2016 in international relations
2017 in international relations
Sirisena, Maithripala
Sirisena, Maithripala
Sirisena, Maithripala